Rosemir Pires dos Santos (born 25 July 1978 in São Paulo) is a football player from Brazil. He plays as a defender for FC Schaffhausen in the Swiss Challenge League.

His clubs have included SFC Opava in the Czech Republic and FC Wil in Switzerland. He joined Schaffhausen on 28 January 2006, and played only once in Challenge League 2007–08 season.

References

External links
 
 CBF 

1978 births
Living people
Brazilian footballers
Brazilian expatriate footballers
Czech First League players
SFC Opava players
FC Schaffhausen players
Swiss Super League players
Footballers from São Paulo
Expatriate footballers in the Czech Republic

Association football defenders